The  Chain, is a caste mainly of Bihar, Jharkhand, Uttar Pradesh and West Bengal. They have traditionally been associated with cultivation and fishery occupations.

History

Distribution

West Bengal

In West Bengal, although the Chain community is widely dispersed through the state, the Government granted Scheduled Castes (SC) status only to Chain members in four districts: Malda, Murshidabad, Nadia and Dakshin Dinajpur. Accordingly, the Socio Economic and Caste Census 2011 specifically reported the Chain only in these locations. Based on the 2011 Census of India, these districts, together, have a population of 323,595 people belonging to the Chain community. The total Chain population in West Bengal is more than four lakh (400,000). The National Commission for Scheduled Castes was reported in 2015 to be initiating a process to extend SC status to the community throughout West Bengal.

References 

Social groups of Uttar Pradesh
Fishing castes